Masuma Dam is a gravity dam located in Chiba Prefecture in Japan. The dam is used for water supply. The catchment area of the dam is 2.2 km2. The dam impounds about 54  ha of land when full and can store 520 thousand cubic meters of water. The construction of the dam was started on 1966 and completed in 1969.

References

Dams in Chiba Prefecture
1969 establishments in Japan